Kuehn Blacksmith Shop–Hardware Store is located in Kaukauna, Wisconsin. It was added to the National Register of Historic Places in 1984 for its architectural significance.

References

Blacksmith shops
Commercial buildings on the National Register of Historic Places in Wisconsin
Hardware stores of the United States
Romanesque Revival architecture in Wisconsin
Commercial buildings completed in 1889
National Register of Historic Places in Outagamie County, Wisconsin